Parliamentary elections were held in Poland on 21 October 2007, after the Sejm voted for its own dissolution on 7 September. The election took place two years before the maximum tenure of four years, with the previous elections having been in September 2005. The early elections were a result of serious allegations of massive corruption on the part of Andrzej Lepper, leader of the Self-Defense of the Republic of Poland, whose party served as a junior coalition partner to the government of Prime Minister Jarosław Kaczyński. All 460 seats in the Sejm and all 100 seats in the Senate were up for election.

The election was won by the largest opposition group, Civic Platform (PO), which soundly defeated the ruling Law and Justice (PiS) party and its allies. Throughout the campaign, polls showed conflicting results as to which of the two parties had the greater support, yet by the closing week the polls had swung in favour of Civic Platform. Three other political groups won election into the Sejm, the centre-left Left and Democrats coalition, the agrarian Polish People's Party, and the tiny German Minority group. Both of Law and Justice's former minor coalition partners, the League of Polish Families and the Self-Defense of the Republic of Poland suffered an enormous voter backlash, failing to cross the 5% electoral threshold in order to enter the Sejm. Consequently, both parties lost all of their seats.

Prime Minister and PiS leader Jarosław Kaczyński stepped down from office on 15 November, with Civic Platform leader Donald Tusk sworn in as Poland's Prime Minister on the following day. Civic Platform consequently formed a coalition majority government with the Polish People's Party.

The turnout for the elections was 53.8%, an increase of 13.2% from the 2005 elections, seeing the highest voter turnout in a Polish parliamentary election since the semi-free elections of 1989.

Contesting parties
Only seven parties contested all 41 electoral districts for the Sejm nationwide. They included:
Law and Justice (PiS)
Civic Platform (PO)
Left and Democrats (LiD)
Polish People's Party (PSL)
League of Polish Families (LPR)
Self-Defense of the Republic of Poland (SRP)
Polish Labour Party (PPP)

Three other parties managed to register in at least one district:
Women's Party (PK) — 7 districts;
Patriotic Self-Defense (SOP) — one district;
German Minority (MN) — one district;

On 26 September 2007, the leader of the National Party of Retirees and Pensioners, Tomasz Mamiński announced his party's withdrawal from the campaign, stating that Polish electoral law and media bias discriminate against smaller parties.

Although only the ten parties mentioned above openly contested elections to the lower house Sejm, there were other groups which entered the race for the Sejm. It is common practice in Polish elections for many smaller parties to register their candidates on the electoral committee lists of the larger parties contesting the election. These included:

LPR's lists include members of the League of Polish Families, Real Politics Union and Right of the Republic;
PiS's lists included members of the Polish People's Party "Piast", National People's Movement, Patriotic Movement, Centre Party and Christian-National Union;
The SRP's lists include candidates from Piotr Ikonowicz's New Left party, Leszek Miller's Polish Left party and Zygmunt Wrzodak's National Congress of Poland;
LiD's lists include members from Democratic Left Alliance, Social Democracy of Poland, Democratic Party - demokraci.pl, Labour Union, Reason of the Polish Left, Democratic Left Party and Polish Socialist Party;
The PPP lists include members of the Communist Party of Poland, Union of the Left, Polish Socialist Party, Reason of the Polish Left, Movement for Unemployed Protection and National Forum of Retirees and Pensioners.

29 political groupings and independents contested the elections to the Senate.

The Greens registered in one district to the Senate (Katowice), receiving 4.55% of votes.

Opinion polls

Results

Sejm

By constituency

Seat distribution by constituency

Senate

Aftermath
Consecutive postponements of the electoral silence's termination (initially planned for 8 PM) by the National Electoral Committee was widely criticized. The Organization for Security and Co-operation in Europe Election Assessment Mission stated that the elections demonstrate a democratic and pluralistic process, but challenges remain in oversight of the public media.

Prime Minister and PiS leader Jarosław Kaczyński stepped down from office on 15 November, and PO leader, Donald Tusk, was sworn in as Poland's Prime Minister the following day. The Civic Platform formed a coalition majority government with the agrarian centrist Polish People's Party.

References

External links

2007 election National Election Commission
Electoral leaflets and posters Tractotheque

Poland
Parliamentary elections in Poland
History of Poland (1989–present)
2007 elections in Poland
October 2007 events in Europe